

Mike Roach Biography 

Born in Driftwood, Pennsylvania, Roach was the son of William and Bridget Roach. Roach's brother, John Roach, pitched one game for the New York Giants in 1887.

Roach played in the minor leagues for 17 seasons. In 1893, he was one of the founders of the semi-professional [Susquehanna] River League made up of teams from Williamsport, Tyrone, Bellefonte, Lock Haven, Bloomsburg and Renovo. Roach was the catcher/manager of the Renovo team and led them to the championship in the league's only year of existence. 

In 1894, he returned to the professional ranks by signing with the Pawtucket Maroons of the Class B New England League.  The following year, Roach moved up the Toledo Swamp Angels/Terre Haute Hottentots of the Class A Western League.  (The Toledo club moved to Terre Haute, Indiana in mid-season.) Roach was given credit for having a .341 batting average in 107 games for 1895. (That is highly suspect as Roach was normally a .250 hitter.) 

He replaced the manager of the Hartford club in mid-season 1898 after the manager left the team. 

When the Atlantic League folded in August, Roach was acquired by the Washington Senators of the National League. In 24 games for Washington, Roach hit .218, collecting 17 hits in 78 at bats. He performed capably behind the plate with a .952 fielding percentage. After the 1899 season, the National League contracted from 12 teams to eight, dropping Louisville, Cleveland, Baltimore, and Washington. This left Roach without a team. On March 5, 1900, Roach’s contract was sold to the Toronto Canucks of the Class A Eastern League. He would never play in the Major Leagues again.

In , Roach was traded to the Class A Eastern League Syracuse club, which due to poor attendance, was moved to Brockton, Massachusetts in mid-season.  In 1902, he signed to play for the Los Angeles Looloos, of the independent California League.  In 1903, he returned East and played for the Columbus Senators of the Class A American Association.  Over the winter he was traded to the Minneapolis Millers, also of the American Association.  However he never played for them as he was injured during the spring and was released.   

From  to  he played and managed in the Class B New York State League.  First with the Ilion (New York) Typewriters.  In 1905, the Ilion team was transferred to Wilkes-Barre, Pennsylvania. Roach was a fan favorite in Wilkes-Barre.  However, the Wilkes-Barre management decided not to resign him for the following year and Roach joined the Binghamton Bingos. 

From 1906 through 1909, Roach remained with the Binghamton club. In 1908 he became part-owner. During his two years of ownership, he was the business manager and a player-manager.  A picture from the April 29, 1908, Binghamton Press, captioned "The Playing-Manager of the Bingo's" shows him with a glove on his left hand, proving that he threw right-handed. After the 1909 season, Roach sold his ownership interest and at the age of 39, retired from playing professional baseball.

After his playing days, he became a hotel proprietor in Binghamton, first running the McDonald Hotel and later the Cadillac Hotel. The McDonald Hotel was located at the corner of Lewis and Fayette Streets. It later was renamed the Hotel Chapman, then the Hotel Gregory. It was demolished in 1966 for urban renewal. Ironically, in 1992 Binghamton built a new baseball stadium near the location of the Hotel McDonald.  The Cadillac Hotel located at 9 Main Street, still stands and (in 2022) is known as Fitzie's Pub.  

On June 18,1912, Roach married Rosemary Manalis (McNelis) in Wilkes-Barre. They had two children, Louis and Rosemary.

On November 12, 1916, after a short illness, at the age of 46, Roach died at the home of his brother, Dr. Charles Roach, in New York City. He was survived by his wife and two infant children. He was buried in Saint Joseph's Cemetery (aka Drury Run Cemetery) in Renovo, Pennsylvania.

Issues Found In Roach's Baseball-Reference Records 
1. 1907:  Baseball-Reference lists Roach as having played for Wilkes-Barre in 1907. Roach played entirely for Binghamton in 1907.

2. 1908:  James Bannon is listed as the manager of Binghamton. Mike Roach actually managed the team. Newspaper articles from the season confirm that Roach was in fact the manager.  Roach and Bannon were friends and played together previously in Toronto and Columbus. In order to entice Bannon to play in Binghamton, Roach initially gave Bannon the title of manager  This was really a ruse to get around the league salary cap as player-managers were allowed to make more than regular players.

3. 1909:  William Roach is listed as the manager of Binghamton. William Roach was Mike Roach's father. There appears to have been a misprint in the New York State League records that was never corrected. 

4. 1909:  Baseball-Reference shows that Roach last played in 1908.  He actually played in 8 games with 11 at-bats and no hits in 1909.  Some of his appearances were as a pinch runner or pinch hitter.

5. 1895:  Baseball-Reference published Western League records exactly as they were published by The Sporting News as provided by the Western League. Mike Roach is given credit for batting .341 in 1895. He was normally a .250 hitter.  The Western League’s records show that 11 players hit over .400 with seven having over 500 at-bats. Every team in the league had a team batting average over .300. While the official league records match Baseball-Reference, they are highly suspect. It is recommended that an audit be done on the Western League batting records for 1895.

SABR (Society For American Baseball Research) 
SABR has published a very thorough and lengthy biography of Mike Roach.  Click here to go to Mike Roach's SABR biography.

References

External links

1869 births
1916 deaths
Major League Baseball catchers
Washington Senators (1891–1899) players
Baseball players from New York (state)
19th-century baseball players
Macon Central City players
Reading Actives players
Pawtucket Maroons players
Toledo Swamp Angels players
Terre Haute Hottentots players
Bangor Millionaires players
Hartford Bluebirds players
Hartford Cooperatives players
Newark Colts players
Toronto Canucks players
Syracuse Stars (minor league baseball) players
Los Angeles (minor league baseball) players
Columbus Senators players
Ilion Typewriters players
Wilkes-Barre Barons (baseball) players
Binghamton Bingoes players